John Huband (c. 1544 – 24 December 1583), of Leominster, Herefordshire; Hillbarrow, Ippsley and Temple Grafton, Warwickshire was a Member of Parliament for Warwickshire in 1571 and 1572.

References

1544 births
1583 deaths
People from Leominster
People from Warwickshire
English MPs 1571
English MPs 1572–1583